Milam Branch is a stream in Hickman County, Tennessee, in the United States.

Milam Branch was named for Jordan Milam, a pioneer who settled on the creek in 1819.

See also
List of rivers of Tennessee

References

Rivers of Hickman County, Tennessee
Rivers of Tennessee